Eremogone fendleri, or Fendler's sandwort, is a perennial plant in the family Caryophyllaceae found in the Colorado Plateau and Canyonlands region of the southwestern United States.

References

Caryophyllaceae